The Holy Blossom Temple is a Reform synagogue located at 1950 Bathurst Street in Toronto, Ontario, Canada. It is the oldest Jewish congregation in Toronto. Founded in 1856, it has more than 7,000 members. W. Gunther Plaut, who died on 8 February 2012 at the age of 99, was a long time Senior Rabbi for this synagogue. Notable members and supporters include Heather Reisman and Gerald Schwartz who made donations to create the Gerald Schwartz/Heather Reisman Centre for Jewish Learning at Holy Blossom Temple.

History
Holy Blossom Temple was the merger of two congregations. The Toronto Hebrew Congregation was formed in 1849 by members from Germany (including Bavaria, Bohemia, and Alsace), Great Britain, the United States, Russia, Galicia, and Lithuania. The Congregation conducted services in members' homes and founded the Pape Avenue Cemetery, Toronto's first Jewish cemetery. The congregation was known as the Daytshishe Shul because of its modern services. In 1856, Lewis Samuel, a Jewish immigrant from York, England arrived in Toronto along with 17 Jewish families from England and Europe and helped them organize the Sons of Israel Congregation. In 1858, the two congregations merged to form the Toronto Hebrew Congregation-Holy Blossom Temple. The Ontario Heritage Foundation lists Holy Blossom as the first Jewish congregation in Canada, west of the Ontario/Quebec border. The first Holy Blossom Synagogue (1897) of Toronto was a new Judeo-Egyptian style templelike building with a front of cut stone, and adorned with a portico with two columns combining intricately detailed stone craftsmanship with Byzantine influences.

For the first 20 years of the Temple's existence, services, conducted in the traditional Orthodox manner, were held in a rented room over Coombe's Drugstore on the southeast corner of Yonge and Richmond streets. In 1876, the congregation built its first synagogue a block east to Victoria and Richmond Street.

Barnett A. Elzas was rabbi at Holy Blossom from 1890 to 1893.

By the 1890s, the congregation had outgrown the Richmond Street Synagogue and made plans for a new one. The dedication of the Bond Street Synagogue on September 15, 1897, attracted much media attention. By that time, Temple membership had grown to 119 families.

During the latter part of the 19th century, changes began to be introduced to ritual and the way services were conducted. Music was introduced and mixed seating allowed. In 1920, Holy Blossom invited Rabbi Barnett R. Brickner, ordained at the Hebrew Union College, to be its rabbi and made application to affiliate with the Union of American Hebrew Congregations, now known as the Union for Reform Judaism (URJ), the Reform movement's umbrella organization.

While the sanctuary of the Bond Street Synagogue was indeed beautiful, space for the growing religious school and social programs was severely lacking. By the 1930s, the congregation recognized that the time had come to move again. At the height of the depression, with a membership of just over 250 families, enough money was raised to buy the land and to build a sanctuary at a location on the then outer edge of the city. While most of Toronto's Jewish population, immigrant, mostly eastern European, poor and working class, were still located south of Bloor Street, particularly in the area between Yonge Street and Ossington Avenue (in particular The Ward, Kensington Market, Spadina Avenue and Bathurst Street), almost two-thirds of Holy Blossom's more established, affluent congregants, many of whom were second or third generation immigrants and hailing from western Europe, lived north of St. Clair Avenue.

Holy Blossom Temple was designed in the Romanesque Revival style in synagogue architecture by architects Chapman and Oxley with Maurice Dalvin Klein. Construction began in 1937 and was completed the next year. Holy Blossom Temple was dedicated on May 20, 1938. The structure's reinforced concrete frame permitted an interior uninterrupted by structural columns. Using concrete and other modern building materials, the building features a campus-like planning of the institution and includes a parking lot. Holy Blossom Temple is a rare example of a building built with a concrete facade before World War II, which is significant given the rise in subsequent decades of architectural styles which emphasized concrete facades, like Brutalism.

The location was fortuitous as, in the years following World War II, the bulk of Toronto's Jewish community migrated north along Bathurst Street and the Forest Hill neighbourhood in which the current structure is situated became a vital Jewish area. Abraham Feinberg, the most famous rabbi in Canada during his lifetime served as the rabbi at the Holy Blossom Temple from 1943 to 1961.

Joan Friedman became the first woman to serve as a rabbi in Canada in 1980, when she was appointed as an Assistant Rabbi at Holy Blossom Temple. Her appointment was followed shortly after by that of Elyse Goldstein as Assistant Rabbi from 1983 to 1986; Goldstein has been noted as the first female rabbi in Canada, but that is incorrect.

The former synagogue on Bond Street was sold to the city's Greek Orthodox parish and is now Saint George's Greek Orthodox Church and serves as the "mother church" for the Greek Orthodox diaspora in Ontario.

References

External links

 Official website

American-Jewish diaspora
Ashkenazi Jewish culture in Toronto
British-Jewish diaspora
Czech-Jewish diaspora
French-Jewish diaspora
German-Jewish diaspora
Polish-Jewish culture in Canada
Russian-Jewish culture in Canada
Ukrainian-Jewish diaspora
Synagogues in Toronto
Reform synagogues in Canada
Religious organizations established in 1856
1856 establishments in Canada
Synagogues completed in 1938
1938 establishments in Canada
Chapman and Oxley buildings
Byzantine Revival synagogues
Romanesque Revival synagogues
Synagogues completed in 1897
1897 establishments in Canada
Synagogue buildings with domes
20th-century religious buildings and structures in Canada
19th-century religious buildings and structures in Canada